The gyile is a type of West African xylophone, with seventeen keys constructed over gourds. It holds a place in the musical traditions of the Dagara and Birifor people of northern Ghana and southern Burkina Faso.

Bernard Woma (d. 2018) was a well-known gyile player from Upper West Ghana who spent many years teaching the instrument and introducing it to audiences around the world.

References

Idiophones struck directly